The following is a list of Australian television ratings for the year 1999.

Network Shares 

* Data Gathered by then Ratings Supplier: A.C Neilsen Australia

Most Watched Broadcasts 1999

Top Rating Regular Programmes - 1999

Weeknight News Readers 1999
REDIRECT List of Australian TV Newsreaders

See also

Television ratings in Australia

References

1999
1999 in Australian television